Genival Lacerda Cavalcante (5 April 1931 – 7 January 2021) was a Brazilian forró singer-songwriter.

Life and career
Lacerda was born in Campina Grande, Paraíba. His main hits are Severina Xique-Xique recorded in 1975, Radinho de Pilha and O Chevette da Menina released in 2010.

In December 2017 he was awarded by the Brazilian government the Order of Cultural Merit.

Death
Lacerda died on 7 January 2021, at age 89, in Recife, Pernambuco, of complications resulting from COVID-19 during the COVID-19 pandemic in Brazil.

References

External links
 
 

1931 births
2021 deaths
20th-century Brazilian male singers
20th-century Brazilian singers
People from Campina Grande
Recipients of the Order of Cultural Merit (Brazil)
21st-century Brazilian male singers
21st-century Brazilian singers
Deaths from the COVID-19 pandemic in Pernambuco